Megachile falcidentata is a species of bee in the family Megachilidae. It was described by Moure & Silveira in 1992.

References

Falcidentata
Insects described in 1992